Swingers is a 2022 Russian romantic comedy-drama film directed by Dmitry Fiks and Andreys Ekis. It was theatrically released in Russia on January 6, 2022.

Plot 
A wealthy businessman, his girlfriend Olga, who dreams of becoming a designer, doctor Andrey and his pharmacist wife Irina find themselves at a New Year swinger's party.

Cast

References

External links 
 

2022 films
2020s Russian-language films
Russian romantic comedy-drama films